Admiral Sir Archibald Gordon Henry Wilson Moore,  (2 February 1862 – 2 April 1934) was a Royal Navy officer who served as Third Sea Lord from 1912 to 1914.

Naval career
Moore joined the Royal Navy in 1875 and served in the Anglo-Egyptian War of 1882. He was promoted to Captain 17 July 1901, and later Rear-Admiral. He was appointed Naval Assistant to the First Sea Lord in 1907 and Director of Naval Ordnance and Torpedoes in 1909. He went on to be Third Sea Lord in 1912. He served in the First World War, commanding the 2nd Battlecruiser Squadron from 1914.

As Vice Admiral Sir David Beatty's second-in-command at the Battle of Dogger Bank, Moore led the sinking of SMS Blücher in January 1915. Heavily criticized for allowing the seriously-damaged SMS Seydlitz and SMS Derfflinger to escape together with the undamaged SMS Moltke, he was "quietly removed from the Grand Fleet and assigned to command (the 9th Cruiser Squadron) in the Canary Islands where the possibility of any appearance by German surface ships was remote".

In 1917, Moore went on to be Controller of the Mechanical Warfare Department. He retired in 1919.

References

1862 births
1934 deaths
Royal Navy admirals of World War I
Knights Commander of the Order of the Bath
Commanders of the Royal Victorian Order
Lords of the Admiralty
Royal Navy personnel of the Anglo-Egyptian War
People from Westminster
Military personnel from London